Valley is a community in the Canadian province of Nova Scotia, located in  Colchester County. There is a school located there called Valley Elementary School, and right across the road there is a convenience store called 'Valley Variety'. Adjacent to the school is the Valley United Church.

References

Churches
Cornerstone Assembly 

Communities in Colchester County